Ptyssalges is a monotypic genus of mites belonging to the monotypic family Ptyssalgidae. The only species is Ptyssalges major.

The species is found in Central America.

References 

Sarcoptiformes
Acari genera
Monotypic arachnid genera